Lunarcy! is a 2012 Canadian documentary film directed by Simon Ennis. The film draws from a cast of astronauts, entrepreneurs and dreamers who each have a unique connection to the Moon.

The film premiered at the 2012 Toronto Film Festival on September 8, and screened at South by Southwest on March 13, 2013, It was picked up for distribution in Canada by Films We Like.

Participants 
 Alan Bean, astronaut and one of the twelve people to have walked on the Moon
 Christopher Carson, hopes to be the first person ever to leave Earth with the intention of never returning
 Matthew Goodman, author of The Sun and the Moon
 Joseph Gutheinz, founder of the Moon Rock Project
 Dennis Hope, claims personal ownership of the Moon.
 Peter Kokh, secretary of the Moon Society and editor of the Moon Miners’ Manifesto
 Jaymie Matthews, astrophysics professor at the University of British Columbia.

Release 
The film received generally favorable reviews. Phil Brown for ThatShelf called the film  "a hilarious, sweet, and oddly touching depiction of the joys and fulfillment of obsession." NOW Magazine's Norman Wilner wrote that the film "feels like it could have been filmed by a young Errol Morris." Daniel Pratt for Exclaim! praised the film, writing "With its quirky soundtrack, fun animation and equally enjoyable stock footage, Lunarcy! is a unique documentary infused with comedy, yet it presents some visionary ideas that can't be completely disregarded."

See also 
Colonization of the Moon
Moon tree
NASA
Sex on the Moon
Stolen and missing Moon rocks
The Case of the Missing Moon Rocks

References

External links 

2012 films
2012 documentary films
Canadian documentary films
English-language Canadian films
Documentary films about outer space
2010s English-language films
2010s Canadian films